Peltasta zonula is a moth of the family Gelechiidae. It was described by Aleksey Maksimovich Gerasimov in 1930. It is found in Uzbekistan and southern Kazakhstan.

Adults have been recorded from mid-April to mid-July at elevations of 600 to 900 meters.

References

Moths described in 1930
Gelechiini